The 1946 West Texas State Buffaloes football team was an American football team that represented West Texas State College (now known as West Texas A&M University) in the Border Conference during the 1946 college football season. In their fourth and final season under head coach Gus Miller, the Buffaloes compiled a 5–5 record (3–4 against conference opponents), finished in fifth place in the Border Conference, and were outscored by a total of 132 to 121.

Schedule

References

West Texas State
West Texas A&M Buffaloes football seasons
West Texas State Buffaloes football